It's a Man's World may refer to:

 It's a Man's World (Anastacia album), 2012
 It's a Man's World (Cher album), 1995
 It's a Man's World (Sarah Vaughan album), 1967
 It's a Man's World (TV series), a television series that aired in 1962–63

See also
 "It's a Man's Man's Man's World", a 1966 song by James Brown, provisionally entitled "It's a Man's World" 
 It's a Man's Man's Man's World (album), a 1966 compilation album by James Brown
 It's a Man's Man's World, a 1974 album by Renée Geyer
 "Man's World" (song), a 2020 song by Marina